WYTZ (97.5 FM, "97.5 Y-Country") is a radio station broadcasting a country music format. Licensed to Bridgman, Michigan, it first began broadcasting under the WCSE call sign.

References
Michiguide.com - WYTZ History

External links

YTZ
Country radio stations in the United States
Radio stations established in 1992